Almonds is a locality in Victoria, Australia. The post office opened on 15 August 1901, closed on 28 December 1919, reopened on 23 December 1925 and later closed on 24 November 1952.

References

Towns in Victoria (Australia)
Shire of Moira